Events in the year 1940 in China.

Incumbents
President: Lin Sen
Premier: Chiang Kai-shek
Vice Premier: H.H. Kung
Foreign Minister: Wang Ch'ung-hui

Events
March 16-April 3 - Battle of Wuyuan
May 1-June 18 - Battle of Zaoyang–Yichang
November 25-30 - Central Hubei Operation

Births
 March - Jia Qinglin
 Yu Lina
 Huang Hengmei
 Liao Xilong
 Liu Yingming
 Zhang Fusen
 Patsy Toh
December - Lei Feng

Deaths
February 23 - Yang Jingyu
March 5 - Cai Yuanpei
April 5 - Song Zheyuan
May 16 - Zhang Zizhong

See also
 List of Chinese films of the 1940s

References

 
1940s in China
Years of the 20th century in China